Premonition (also known as Head or The Impure) is a 1972 horror film written and directed by Alan Rudolph. The film was Rudolph's first after being an assistant director of 11 episodes of the 1960s sitcom The Brady Bunch, as well as the films The Big Bounce (1969) and Riot (1969). Originally titled Head, the distributors first changed the title to Premonition and later for a time to Impure.

Plot

Red flowers cause three druggie college students to have premonitions when they see their own deaths. They then start dying in the manner of their earlier premonitions.

Cast

 Carl Crow as Neil
 Tim Ray as Andy
 Winfrey Hester Hill as Baker
 Victor Izay as Kilrenny
 Cheryl Adams as Susan
 Tom Akers as RGM
 Lee Alpert as Brother
 Barry Brown as Mike

See also
 List of American films of 1972

References

External links

 Love-In Clip for the Film

1972 films
American horror films
1970s English-language films
Films directed by Alan Rudolph
1972 directorial debut films
1972 horror films
1970s American films